René Cabrera (born 21 October 1925, date of death unknown) was a Bolivian football midfielder who was a non-playing squad member of Bolivia in the 1950 FIFA World Cup. He also played for Club Jorge Wilstermann. Cabrera is deceased.

References

External links

1925 births
Year of death missing
Bolivian footballers
Bolivia international footballers
Association football midfielders
C.D. Jorge Wilstermann players
1949 South American Championship players
1950 FIFA World Cup players